Kristan Singleton (born October 12, 1971) is a swimmer who represented the United States Virgin Islands. He competed at the 1988 Summer Olympics and the 1992 Summer Olympics.

References

External links
 

1971 births
Living people
United States Virgin Islands male swimmers
Olympic swimmers of the United States Virgin Islands
Swimmers at the 1988 Summer Olympics
Swimmers at the 1992 Summer Olympics
Place of birth missing (living people)
Harvard Crimson men's swimmers